These are the official results of the Women's Shot Put event at the 1991 IAAF World Championships in Tokyo, Japan. There were a total number of 24 participating athletes, with two qualifying groups and the final held on Saturday August 24, 1991. The qualification mark was set at 18.50 metres.

Medalists

Schedule
All times are Japan Standard Time (UTC+9)

Abbreviations
All results shown are in metres

Records

Qualifying round

Final

See also
 1988 Women's Olympic Shot Put (Seoul)
 1990 Women's European Championships Shot Put (Split)
 1991 Shot Put Year Ranking
 1992 Women's Olympic Shot Put (Barcelona)
 1994 Women's European Championships Shot Put (Helsinki)

References
 Results
 IAAF

S
Shot put at the World Athletics Championships
1991 in women's athletics